Puma Clyde is a basketball shoe manufactured by athletic goods company Puma. It was made famous by its endorsement of Walt Frazier. Originally released in 1970/71, the shoe is significant within the old school hip hop and skate punk subcultures.

Sources

External links
 Puma Website

Athletic shoe brands
Puma (brand)